is a passenger railway station of the West Japan Railway Company (JR-West) located in the city of Iga, Mie, Japan.

Lines
Shindō Station is served by the Kansai Main Line and is located 86.1 rail kilometres from the terminus of the line at Nagoya Station and 26.2 rail kilometers from Kameyama Station.

Layout
The station consists of one island platform serving two tracks, connected to the station building by a footbridge.

Platforms

History
Shindō Station was opened on July 15, 1921, as a station on the Imperial Government Railways (IGR), which became Japan National Railways (JNR) after World War II. Freight operations were discontinued from August 1, 1970. With the privatization of JNR on April 1, 1987, the station came under the control of JR-West. In July 2002, the station was extensively remodeled, with the original side platform and island platform replaced by a single island platform and with the station building rebuilt.

Passenger statistics
In fiscal 2019, the station was used by an average of 195 passengers daily (boarding passengers only).

Surrounding area
 Moku Moku Farm

See also
 List of railway stations in Japan

References

See also
 List of railway stations in Japan

External links

  

Railway stations in Japan opened in 1921
Railway stations in Mie Prefecture
Iga, Mie